Canal Panda is a Portuguese pay television channel, the first one dedicated to kids programming, mostly animated series for children aged 6–14. The channel was founded in 1996 as Panda Club in Spain and Portugal, but the name was changed to Canal Panda in 1997. In 2001, the channel was closed down in Spain, thus focusing on the Portuguese market. It was relaunched in Spain in 2011 and closed down again in 2022.
Canal Panda is currently owned by Dreamia, a joint-venture between AMC Networks International Iberia and NOS.

Currently, Canal Panda is a Portuguese preschooler-focused channel, airing programs targeted at the 3-8 age range.

History

Canal Panda started operations under the name Panda Club on April 1, 1996 on cable operators in Spain and Portugal. In March 1997 the channel rebranded to the current name. Following the closure of the channel in Spain, in January 2001, the channel aimed exclusively at the Portuguese market.

Current programmes
Masha and the Bear
Masha's Tales
Masha's Spooky Stories
Peppa Pig
Super Wings
Noddy, Toyland Detective
Heidi
Ricky Zoom
Simon
Norman Picklestripes
Pikwik Pack
Enchantimals: Tales from the Everwilde
True and the Rainbow Kingdom
Super Monsters
Dragons: Rescue Riders
Madagascar: A Little Wild
Barbie: It Takes Two
Gabby's Dollhouse
Trolls: TrollsTopia

References

External links
  
  

AMC Networks International
Children's television networks
Television stations in Spain
Television stations in Portugal
Television in Andorra
Television in Gibraltar
Spanish-language television stations
Portuguese-language television stations
Television channels and stations established in 1996
1996 establishments in Portugal
Television in Macau
Preschool education television networks